José Luis Sáenz de Heredia (10 April 1911 – 4 November 1992) was a Spanish film director. He was born in Madrid.  His film Ten Ready Rifles was entered into the 9th Berlin International Film Festival.

Filmography
 Patricio miró a una estrella (1934)
 Juan Simón's Daughter (1935)
 ¿Quién me quiere a mí? (1936)
 ¡A mi no me mire usted! (1941)
 Raza (1942)
 El Escándalo (1944)
 The Road to Babel (1945)
 El destino se disculpa (1945)
 Bambú (1945)
 Mariona Rebull (1947)
 Las aguas bajan negras (1948)
 La mies es mucha (1948)
 Don Juan (1950)
 The Eyes Leave a Trace (1952)
 Todo es posible en Granada (1954)
 Historias de la radio (1955)
 The Big Lie (1956)
 Faustina (1957)
 Diez fusiles esperan (1959)
 El Indulto (1960)
 The Reprieve (1961)
 The Mustard Grain (1962)
 Los derechos de la mujer (1963)
 The Fair of the Dove (1963)
 Franco, ese hombre (1964)
 Television Stories (1965)
 Fray Torero (1966)
 Pero... ¿en qué país vivimos? (1967)
 Relaciones casi públicas (1968)
 Juicio de faldas (1969)
 El Taxi de los conflictos (1969)
 ¡Se armó el belén! (1969)
 Don Erre que Erre (1970)
 El alma se serena (1970)
 Me debes un muerto (1971)
 La Decente (1971)
 Los Gallos de la madrugada (1971)
 Proceso a Jesús (1973)
 Cuando los niños vienen de Marsella (1974)
 Solo ante el Streaking (1975)

References

External links
 

1911 births
1992 deaths
Film directors from Madrid